The white-tailed warbler (Poliolais lopezi) is a species of bird in the family Cisticolidae, the only of its genus Poliolais. It is found in the Cameroon line (including Bioko).

Its natural habitat is subtropical or tropical moist montane forest. It is becoming rare due to habitat loss.

References

Ryan, Peter (2006). Family Cisticolidae (Cisticolas and allies). pp. 378–492 in del Hoyo J., Elliott A. & Christie D.A. (2006) Handbook of the Birds of the World. Volume 11. Old World Flycatchers to Old World Warblers'' Lynx Edicions, Barcelona 

white-tailed warbler
Birds of the Gulf of Guinea
Birds of Central Africa
white-tailed warbler
Taxonomy articles created by Polbot